Year of the Dog is the third album by Scottish Celtic rock group Wolfstone. It was released in 1994.

Track listing
 "Holy Ground" - 3:57
 "Ballavanich" - 4:45
The Boys from Ballavanich
Mrs. Crehan's
 "The Sea King" - 6:03
 "Brave Foot Soldiers" - 4:50
 "Double Rise Set" - 5:25
Gingerhog's No.2
The Double Rise
Crossing the Mince
Give Us a Drink of Water
 "White Gown" - 4:26
 "Morag's Reels" - 5:19
Morag's Reel
Laura Lynn Cunningham
The Harsh February
Miss Lyall
 "Braes of Sutherland" - 7:29
Braes of Sutherland
The Youngest Ancient Mariner
 "Dinner's Set" - 4:14
Dinner's Dangerous River Jacket
Richard Dwyer's Reel
Sandy MacLeod of Garafad

Liner notes
"Holy Ground": This song was written about the Irish conflict where religion is still used as an excuse for violence.
"The Sea King": This song came to life through an old traditional Orkney poem which Ivan unearthed and set to music some years ago.
"Brave Foot Soldiers": In August 1993 two separate groups of people began a march that would take one from Wick in the north and the other, from Stranraer in the south to meet in Edinburgh. The march, organised by the Scottish Trades Union Congress, was designed as a protest to the government over what many Scottish people regarded as a denial of a basic human right: the right to work.
"White Gown": In February 1993 we played a concert on the east coast of America. That night we were aware of a KKK rally being held not half an hour away. The KKK is organised bigotry at its worst but will only ever be overcome by the strength of pacifism.
"Braes of Sutherland": Ivan wrote this song after reading the story of a Sutherland woman who was forced to emigrate sometime around the late 18th and early 19th century. Sadly, there are countless other similar tales.

Personnel
Duncan Chisholm: fiddle
Stuart Eaglesham: acoustic guitar, electric guitar, vocals
Struan Eaglesham: keyboards
Ivan Drever: lead vocals, acoustic guitar, bouzouki
Wayne Mackenzie: bass guitar
Mop Youngson: drums
Taj Wyzgowski: electric guitar
Gordon Duncan: pipes
Phil Cunningham: accordion, whistle

Wolfstone albums
1994 albums